Sooriya Arana is a 2004 Sri Lankan Sinhala children's thriller film directed by Somaratne Dissanayake and produced by Renuka Balasooriya. It stars Jackson Anthony and Jayalath Manoratne in lead roles along with Sajitha Anthony and Dasun Madusanka. Music composed by Rohana Weerasinghe. It is the highest grossing film in Sri Lankan cinema history. It is the 1025th Sri Lankan film in the Sinhala cinema.

Before the screening of the film, it created a controversy stating that film shows disrespect on the Buddhist monks and being labelled of insulting the Sinhala race. On 5 April 2004, a symposium with a theme "Buddhist symbol in Cinema" was held at the Centre For Society and Religion (CSR) on Deans Road in Maradana.

Plot

In a rural village, villagers don't have any idea about merit and demerits. Sediris, who is a hunter, often hunts animals with his son, Tikira in order to make their daily livelihood. One day, An elderly monk enters the village with his little disciple monk, who is same old as Tikira. They start live in a den in village to focus on meditation. Soon, the elderly monk sees the sins committed by villagers and advices them to prevent themselves from sins to lead a happy healthy life, explaining about merits and demerits. Villagers are impressed with kindness of two monks and start visiting them and doing good deeds. Sediris finds the two monks as biggest hurdles to his hunting career and tries to chase them away, but in vain. Soon, Tikira befriends with little monk and starts hanging out and playing with him. Tikira stops hunting animals after little monk explains him about the difference between goodness and evilness. 

Sedaris anger is increased due to Tikira's sudden change. He develops more hate to the elderly monk. However, villagers start chasing Sediris on learning his conspiracy to harm two monks. Sediris ends up getting badly injured by his own trap. Despite of Sediris's evil deeds, two monks help him with humankind. Eventually, Sediris realizes his mistakes and seeks forgiveness from the monks, who forgive him without thinking twice. Finally, Sediris is impressed with Buddha Dharma and stops hunting starting a happy lifestyle while Tikira becomes a monk.

Cast
 Jackson Anthony as Sediris
 Jayalath Manoratne as Loku Hamuduruwo
 Sajitha Anthony as Tikira
 Dasun Madusanka as Sumedha 'Podi Hamuduruwo'
 G.R Perera as Arachchila, Village headman
 D.B. Gangodathenna as Peethara Mama
 Duleeka Marapana as Sediris's wife
 Jayani Senanayake as Sediris's concubine
 Giriraj Kaushalya as Salesman
 Ariyasena Gamage as Korala
 Pramudi Karunarathna as Tikira's sister
 Bertie Nihal Susiripala

Box office
The film received positive reviews and became the highest grossing Sri Lanka film at that time with 12 SL Crores. It successfully passed 100 days and earned Rs.11 million for 104 days at Savoya Cinema alone. At the end of May 2004, it earned Rs. 78 million island wide.

Soundtrack

Awards and nominations
The film was critically adjudged by many local and international film festival and won many awards as well.

Houston International Film Festival

|-
|| 2008 ||| Sooriya Arana || Silver Remi Award for the Best Feature || 
|-

Presidential Awards

|-
|| 2005 ||| Sooriya Arana || Award for The Most Popular Film of the Year || 
|-
|| 2005 ||| Sooriya Arana || Award for The Best Lyrics || 
|-
|| 2005 ||| Sooriya Arana || Award for The Best Singer (Harshana Dissanayake) || 
|-
|| 2005 ||| Sooriya Arana || Award for The Best Make-Up (Ebert Wijesinghe) || 
|-
|| 2005 ||| Sooriya Arana || Award for The Best Sound (Shayamani Premasundara) || 
|-
|| 2005 ||| Sooriya Arana || Award for The Best Cinematography (Channa Deshapriya) || 
|-
|| 2005 ||| Sooriya Arana || Jury Award Performance (Dasun Madushanka) || 
|-
|| 2005 ||| Sooriya Arana || Jury Award Performance (Sajitha Anuththara) || 
|-
|| 2005 ||| Sooriya Arana || Award for The Best Actor (Jackson Anthony) || 
|-
|| 2005 ||| Sooriya Arana || Award for The Best Script (Somaratne Dissanayake) || 
|-

References

External links
 
 Synopsis and brief review at FilmsLanka

2004 films
2000s Sinhala-language films